The 2016 Egypt Cup Final decided the winner of the 2016 Egypt Cup, the 84th season of Egypt's premier knockout football cup competition. It was played on 8 August 2016 at Borg El Arab Stadium in Alexandria.

Zamalek, who have won the three previous finals, faced Al Ahly, the record-title holders who last won in 2007. Zamalek won the match 3–1 to secure their 4th consecutive and 25th overall title.

As Zamalek won the Cup, they will play against the 2015–16 Egyptian Premier League winner Al Ahly in the 2016 Egyptian Super Cup. Because both Zamalek and Al Ahly qualified for the Champions League, the spot awarded to the Cup winner (Confederation Cup) is passed to the fourth-placed team which were the next best teams in the table not already qualified for any African competition.

Background

Route to the final
The Egypt Cup is a thirty-two team single-elimination knockout cup competition. There are a total of four rounds leading up to the final. Teams are drawn against each other in pots, and the winner after 90 minutes advances. If still tied, extra time, and if necessary penalties are used to determine the winner.

Match

Details
Zamalek were the "home" team (for administrative purposes), as they played the first semi-final match.

Statistics

References

2016
Al Ahly SC matches
Zamalek SC matches
2015–16 in Egyptian football